Defending champion Stefanos Tsitsipas defeated Alejandro Davidovich Fokina in the final, 6–3, 7–6(7–3) to win the singles tennis title at the 2022 Monte-Carlo Masters. He became the sixth player to win consecutive titles at the Monte-Carlo Masters in the Open Era. The win also earned him his second Masters 1000 title and his eighth career singles title overall. 

Former world No. 1 and eleven-time Monte-Carlo Masters champion Rafael Nadal did not compete due to a stress fracture in his rib. This marked the first edition of the tournament not to feature Nadal in the main draw since 2004.

Seeds
The top eight seeds received a bye into the second round.

Draw

Finals

Top half

Section 1

Section 2

Bottom half

Section 3

Section 4

Other entry information

Wildcards

Protected ranking
  Borna Ćorić

Qualifiers

Lucky losers

Withdrawals

Qualifying

Seeds

Qualifiers

Lucky losers

Draw

First qualifier

Second qualifier

Third qualifier

Fourth qualifier

Fifth qualifier

Sixth qualifier

Seventh qualifier

References

External links
 Main draw
 Qualifying draw

Singles
Monte-Carlo Masters - Singles